Reterre is a commune in the Creuse department in the Nouvelle-Aquitaine region in central France.

Geography

Population

Sights
 The church, dating from the nineteenth century.
 The ruins of a twelfth-century church.
 The ruins of a feudal castle at Malleville.

See also
Communes of the Creuse department

References

External links

Official website of Reterre 

Communes of Creuse